The 2018 Prudential U.S. Figure Skating Championships were held from December 29, 2017 – January 8, 2018 at the SAP Center in San Jose, California. Medals were awarded in the disciplines of men's singles, ladies singles, pair skating, and ice dance at the senior, junior, novice, intermediate, and juvenile levels. The results were part of the U.S. selection criteria for the 2018 Winter Olympics, 2018 Four Continents Championships, 2018 World Junior Championships, and the 2018 World Championships.

San Jose was announced as the host in August 2016.

Qualifying 
Competitors qualified at regional and sectional competitions held from October to November 2017 or earned a bye. Skaters must place in the top 4 in order to earn a spot at the National Figure Skating Championships. 

In late December 2017, U.S. Figure Skating published the list of skaters who had qualified or received a bye.

Schedule 
The competition took place over ten days. All times are in PST.

Medal summary

Senior

Junior

Novice

Intermediate

Juvenile

Senior results

Senior men

Senior ladies

Senior pairs

Senior ice dance

Junior results

Junior men

Junior ladies

Junior pairs

Junior ice dance

Novice results

Novice men

Novice ladies

Novice pairs

Novice ice dance

International team selections

Winter Olympics 
U.S. Figure Skating began announcing the team for the 2018 Winter Olympics on January 6, 2018.

The selections for the team event at the Olympics were as follows:

World Championships 
U.S. Figure Skating began announcing the team for the 2018 World Championships on January 6, 2018.

Four Continents 
U.S. Figure Skating began announcing the team for the 2018 Four Continents Championships on January 6, 2018.

World Junior Championships 
U.S. Figure Skating began announcing the team for the 2018 World Junior Championships on January 6, 2018.

References

Citations

External links 
 
 Results at U.S. Figure Skating

U.S. Figure Skating Championships
U.S. Figure Skating Championships
U.S. Figure Skating Championships